Veronika Gennadievna Chumikova (born 4 July 1994) is a Russian freestyle wrestler of Chuvash heritage. She is a silver medalist at the European Wrestling Championships. She also won a medal at the Golden Grand Prix Ivan Yarygin held in Krasnoyarsk, Russia on five occasions (in 2014, 2017, 2018, 2020 and 2022).

Career 

She won the gold medal in the women's 58 kg event at the 2016 World University Wrestling Championships held in Çorum, Turkey. In 2018, she competed at the Klippan Lady Open in Klippan, Sweden without winning a medal. Later that year, she won the gold medal in the women's 59 kg event at the 2018 Russian National Women's Freestyle Wrestling Championships held in Smolensk, Russia.

In 2020, she won one of the bronze medals in the women's 57 kg event at the Individual Wrestling World Cup held in Belgrade, Serbia. In March 2021, she competed at the European Qualification Tournament in Budapest, Hungary hoping to earn a place for a competitor at the 2020 Summer Olympics in Tokyo, Japan. She lost her first match against Evelina Nikolova of Bulgaria which meant that she could no longer earn a spot for the Olympics in this tournament. A month later, she won the silver medal in the women's 59 kg event at the 2021 European Wrestling Championships held in Warsaw, Poland. In May 2021, she earned an Olympic spot in the women's 57 kg event for the ROC at the World Olympic Qualification Tournament. Valeria Koblova competed in the women's 57 kg event at the 2020 Summer Olympics.

In October 2021, she lost her bronze medal match in the women's 57 kg event at the World Wrestling Championships in Oslo, Norway. In January 2022, she won one of the bronze medals in the women's 57 kg event at the Golden Grand Prix Ivan Yarygin held in Krasnoyarsk, Russia. In February 2022, she also won one of the bronze medals in the 57 kg event at the Yasar Dogu Tournament held in Istanbul, Turkey.

Achievements

References

External links 

 

1994 births
Living people
People from Kanashsky District
Chuvash people
Russian female sport wrestlers
European Wrestling Championships medalists
Sportspeople from Chuvashia
21st-century Russian women